Zhuhai Tower is a  tall skyscraper in Zhuhai, Guangdong, China. It is ranked 35th on the list of tallest buildings in China. 

Construction started in 2013 and was completed in 2017. It houses a St. Regis Hotels & Resorts-branded hotel, offices, and a convention center.

References

 

Buildings and structures in Zhuhai
Hotel buildings completed in 2017
Office buildings completed in 2017
Skyscrapers in Guangdong
Skyscraper office buildings in China
Skyscraper hotels in China
St. Regis hotels